Naalai Namadhe is a 1975 Indian Tamil-language masala film directed by K. S. Sethumadhavan. The film stars M. G. Ramachandran, Latha, Chandramohan, Vennira Aadai Nirmala, and M. N. Nambiar. A remake of the 1973 Hindi film Yaadon Ki Baaraat, it revolves around three brothers being separated in their childhood due to the actions of a killer, and growing up to live separate lives. The film was released on 4 July 1975 and became a success.

Plot 

Separated in their childhood by Ranjith, a killer, brothers Shankar, Vijay and Radhan grow up in different paths in life. While Shankar becomes a goon and accidentally for Ranjith himself, Radhan becomes a singer and Vijay a do-gooder. They have a family song which the three of them knows.

Fate makes them cross path and Radhan and Vijay meetup first. Even though Shankar is there, he cannot acknowledge them for he knows his gang will kill them. How Shankar manages to get back to them without the gang catching up while Vijay with Radhan's help come up to catch the gang is the rest of the story.

Cast 
M. G. Ramachandran as Shankar and Vijay
Latha as Rani
Chandramohan as Radhan
Vennira Aadai Nirmala as Leela
M. N. Nambiar as Ranjith
Nagesh as Rango alias Rapathavandhu
M. G. Chakrapani as Devdass (guest appearance)
M. G. Soman as Ravi (guest appearance)
Rajasree as Kamala (guest appearance)
V. S. Raghavan as Sharma
S. V. Ramdass as Raju
K. Kannan as Madhan, Martin
V. Gopalakrishnan as Robert
Karikol Raju as Worker in bar
Peeli Sivam as Fake doctor
T. K. S. Natarajan as Marwadi
Babloo Prithiveeraj as young Vijay

Production 
Naalai Namadhe is a remake of the Hindi film Yaadon Ki Baaraat (1973). M. G. Ramachandran, in a dual role, reprised the roles originally portrayed by Dharmendra and Vijay Arora. When Ramachandran and director K. S. Sethumadhavan were discussing what to title the film, a journalist friend of theirs suggested Naalai Namadhe, and that was finalised.

Soundtrack 
The music was composed by M. S. Viswanathan, with lyrics by Vaali.

Reception 
Kanthan of Kalki called the film old-fashioned, but appreciated Sethumadhavan's direction and the colour cinematography.

References

External links 

1970s masala films
1970s Tamil-language films
1975 films
Films directed by K. S. Sethumadhavan
Films scored by M. S. Viswanathan
Tamil remakes of Hindi films